The following newspapers are published in Dallas, Texas (USA):

Auto Revista
Daily Commercial Record
Dallas Business Journal
The Dallas Morning News
Al Día - produced by The Dallas Morning News
Quick - produced by The Dallas Morning News
Dallas Observer
Dallas Voice
El Extra
Reform Dallas
Slavic Voice of America
Star Local News - distributes free and subscription newspapers in Dallas suburbs, including: 
Allen American
Carrollton Leader
Celina Record
The Colony Courier Leader 
Coppell Gazette
Frisco Enterprise
The Leader - in the cities of Flower Mound, Lewisville and Highland Village
Little Elm Journal 
McKinney Courier-Gazette
Mesquite News
Plano Star Courier
The Rowlette Lakeshore Times
Southlake Times
Texas Catholic
Texas Jewish Post
The Dallas Examiner
Tre Weekly News Magazine - headquartered in Garland, serving the Vietnamese immigrants in DFW metroplex 
World Journal - published in Richardson, serving Dallas

The Fort Worth Star-Telegram is based in Fort Worth, and The Park Cities News, Preston Hollow People,
 and Park Cities People are based in other Dallas suburbs.

See also
 Texas media
 List of newspapers in Texas
 List of radio stations in Texas
 List of television stations in Texas
 Media of cities in Texas: Abilene, Amarillo, Austin, Beaumont, Brownsville, Dallas, Denton, El Paso, Fort Worth, Houston, Killeen, Laredo, Lubbock, McAllen, McKinney, Midland, Odessa, San Antonio, Waco, Wichita Falls
 Texas literature

References

Bibliography
 



Newspapers published in the Dallas–Fort Worth metroplex
Dallas-related lists
Dallas